The Professional Skaters Association International is the largest figure skating coaches association in the world. The PSA was founded on August 10, 1938, in Lake Placid, New York, as the American Skaters Guild, just two years (1936) after the Ice Teachers Guild was formed in England by Jacques Gerschwiler, Howard Nicholson, Gladys Hogg and Eric Van De Weyden.

On January 21, 1950, at the Broadmoor World Arena in Colorado Springs, Colorado, the American Skaters Guild was reorganized and renamed the Professional Skaters Guild of America.

In May 1995, the PSGA once again changed its identity to the Professional Skaters Association, International (PSA).  With this new name the association took on a renewed role in the sport of figure skating, but vowed to remain rooted in its 57-year history and ideals. The “birth” of the PSA reflected the changing scope of this organization's activities and of the worldwide skating industry. The Board of Directors felt it was time to adopt this new name, acknowledging that the PSA is the world's premier professional skating organization. The PSA is the official figure skating coach's education, training and accreditation program for U.S. Figure Skating and the Ice Skating Institute.

References

Figure skating organizations
Sports organizations established in 1938